"The Block Party" is the debut solo single by rapper and singer Lisa Lopes, and was the first and final single from her internationally released debut album Supernova. The song contains a sample of Earth, Wind & Fire's "Drum Song" throughout the entire song.

The 2001 single failed to generate any success in the US, coming in at No. 121 on the R&B charts, and missing the Hot 100 altogether. However, it did chart in the UK, as well as Australia and other countries in Europe.

Track listing
European and Australian maxi single
 "The Block Party" (Radio Mix) – 4:05
 "The Block Party" (Dallas Austin Remix) – 3:54
 "Friends" (featuring Cassandra Lucas) – 4:45
 "Tampered With" (featuring Wanya Morris and Shamari Fears) – 4:36

UK cd single
 "The Block Party" (Radio Mix) – 4:05
 "The Block Party" (Dallas Austin Remix) – 3:54
 "Friends" (featuring Cassandra Lucas) – 4:45
 "The Block Party" (music video - enhanced interactive element)

Music video
The music video was directed by Hype Williams and Lopes and was shot on July 10, 2001. Lopes said of the video, "We are in the wonderful world of Left Eye and it's in my galaxy, Supernova." Her adopted daughter Snow appeared in the video.

Charts

2009 version

"Block Party" is the second posthumous single by the late rapper, singer, and songwriter Lisa Lopes and is the second single from her first posthumous album, Eye Legacy and her third solo single.

History
The song was originally recorded for Lopes' solo debut Supernova and was released as the album's first and only single. The song was reworked and remixed for her first posthumous album, Eye Legacy, and features Lil Mama. After the first single "Let's Just Do It" failed to chart in the United States, "Block Party" was announced to be released as the second single after its positive critical reception. The song was not released as a single, but rather as a ringtone, along with all the songs of Eye Legacy.

References

External links
LeftEyeLegacy

2001 songs
2001 debut singles
2009 singles
Lil Mama songs
Lisa Lopes songs
Songs written by Lisa Lopes
Songs written by Salaam Remi
Music videos directed by Hype Williams
Arista Records singles